Felix Kwasi Owusu-Adjapong (born February 13, 1944) is a Ghanaian politician and a former member  of the  Parliament of Ghana as a New Patriotic Party (NPP) representative for Akyem Swedru  of the eastern region of Ghana. He was also a former minister of for Energy and a former national chairman of the new patriotic party.

Early life and education
Felix Owusu-Adjapong studied Land Economy at the Kwame Nkrumah University of Science and Technology in Kumasi. He also studied Housing, Planning and Building at the Bouwcentrum Institute in Rotterdam, Urban Land Appraisal at the University of Reading in England, and law at the Ghana School of Law.

Political career 
Owusu-Agyapong is a member of the 2nd,3rd and 4th Parliament of the 4th republic of Ghana. He was first elected Member of Parliament  for Akyem Swedru in the 1996 Ghanaian general elections with a total of 15,824 making 45.30% of the total valid votes cast that year. He was re-elected in the 2000 Ghanaian general elections with a majority of 14,614  making 56.80% of the votes cast. In February 2001 he was appointed Minister for Transport and Communications, and in April 2003 Minister of Parliamentary Affairs.

In the  2004 Ghanaian general elections,he was elected again as Member of Parliament with a majority vote of 21,048 making 66.94% of the total votes polled that year. In 2007 he resigned his ministerial position to make an unsuccessful bid for the presidential nomination of the NPP. He did not contest his parliamentary constituency at the 2008 Ghanaian General Elections, and Joseph Ampomah Bosompem won it for the NPP with a majority of 8,469. In June 2008 he was appointed Minister of Energy, holding the post until the end of Kufuor's government in January 2009.

See also
 New Patriotic Party
 Kufuor government

References

Living people
1944 births
Kwame Nkrumah University of Science and Technology alumni
Ghanaian MPs 1997–2001
Ghanaian MPs 2001–2005
Ghanaian MPs 2005–2009
Communications ministers of Ghana
Energy ministers of Ghana
Transport ministers of Ghana
New Patriotic Party politicians
University of Reading
Government ministers of Ghana
People from Eastern Region (Ghana)
Ghana School of Law alumni
21st-century Ghanaian politicians